Sir Shouson Chow (1861–1959), KBE, LLD, JP, also known as Chow Cheong-Ling, was a Hong Kong businessman.  He had been a Qing dynasty official and prominent in the Government of Hong Kong.

Family
Chow is said to have been born in Wong Chuk Hang San Wai, a village at the foot of present-day Shouson Hill. Wong Chuk Hang San Wai was a village of a Chow lineage. His father was compradore of the Canton-based Canton and Hong Kong Steamship Company.  His grandfather was the head of "Little Hong Kong", who helped Charles Elliot post the first official proclamation of Hong Kong Island in 1841. He had a son, named Chow Yat-Kwong.

Career
Among the third group of Chinese students sponsored by the Qing government to the United States in the 1870s, Chow left China in 1874 and studied at Phillips Academy, Andover (class of 1880) and Columbia University. After his graduation he worked for the Qing government.

In 1881 he joined the Korean Customs Service under Yuan Shikai. Later he was the president of the China Merchant Steam Navigation Company of Tientsin from 1897 to 1903, and the managing director of the Peking-Mukden Railway between 1903 and 1907.

He was the Customs and Trade Superintendent and Counselor for Foreign Affairs in Newchwang between 1907 and 1910. During this period he was promoted to Mandarin of the Second Rank. He left government service after the 1911 Revolution and became director of various companies and charities.

Public Service

Chow was appointed a Justice of the Peace in Hong Kong in 1907. He was subsequently elected to membership of the North British Academy of Arts. In 1918, he founded the Bank of East Asia with three Chinese partners where he was the chairman of the board from 1925 to 1929.  In 1922 he was appointed a member of the Sanitary Board, the precursor of the Urban Council, and the Legislative Council, where he served until 1931.  In 1926, he became the first Chinese member of the Executive Council, and was knighted.  In 1933, he was awarded an honorary Doctorate of Laws.

During the Japanese Occupation of Hong Kong, Chow and other leading Chinese figures joined the Chinese Cooperative Council founded by the Japanese military which he was the chairman to maintain public order amongst the Chinese population. They did not suffer from punishment after the return of British rule.

Memory
Shouson Hill, in the south of Hong Kong Island, is named after him.

External links
 Chow Cheong-ling (Zhou Changling) 周長齡 from Biographies of Prominent Chinese c.1925.

References

1861 births
1959 deaths
Members of the Legislative Council of Hong Kong
Members of the Executive Council of Hong Kong
Members of the Sanitary Board of Hong Kong
Hong Kong businesspeople
Hong Kong collaborators with Imperial Japan
People from Bao'an County
Bank of East Asia
Hong Kong expatriates in China
Hong Kong expatriates in Korea
Hong Kong Anglicans